"Everything Now" is a song by Canadian indie rock band Arcade Fire. It was released on June 1, 2017, as the first single from the band's fifth studio album, Everything Now (2017). It was produced by Thomas Bangalter, Steve Mackey and the band itself. The song samples "The Coffee Cola Song" by Francis Bebey. "Everything Now" is Arcade Fire's first number-one hit on a Billboard chart.

Release
Before playing "Neighborhood 1 (Tunnels)" during their Sunday headlining set at the 2016 Voodoo Music + Arts Experience in New Orleans, Arcade Fire recorded the audience singing a melody off their upcoming album, which became "Everything Now". The first release of the song came during the Primavera Sound festival in Barcelona, Spain on May 31, 2017. At the festival, a limited edition orange 12" vinyl single was made for sale at a merchandise stand. "Everything Now" acted as the A-side and its instrumental acted as the B-side. Digital versions of the song were released on the following day. On June 9, the 12" single became available again at record stores in the United States and United Kingdom.

Music video
A music video for "Everything Now" was released on June 1, 2017 through YouTube. It was directed by The Sacred Egg and shot in Los Angeles.

Track listing

Credits and personnel

Arcade Fire
Win Butler – lead vocals, bass guitar
Régine Chassagne – piano, backing vocals
Richard Reed Parry – electric guitar, backing vocals
William Butler – keyboards, backing vocals
Tim Kingsbury – acoustic guitar, backing vocals
Jeremy Gara – drums

Additional musicians
Harmonistic Praise Crusade – choir
Thomas Bangalter – synthesizer
Rebecca Crenshaw – strings
Helen Gillet – strings
Owen Pallett – strings, orchestral arrangements
Sarah Neufeld – strings
Patrick Bebey – flute

Recording personnel
Thomas Bangalter – production
Steve Mackey – production
Arcade Fire – production, mixing
Mark Lawson – engineering
Iain Berryman – engineering
Florian Lagatta – engineering
Eric Heigle – engineering
Max Prior – assistant engineering
Craig Silvey – mixing
Greg Calbi – mastering

Charts

Weekly charts

Year-end charts

Certifications

Release history

References

2017 singles
2017 songs
Arcade Fire songs
Columbia Records singles
Song recordings produced by Thomas Bangalter
Song recordings produced by Steve Mackey
Songs written by William Butler (musician)
Songs written by Win Butler
Songs written by Régine Chassagne
Songs written by Jeremy Gara
Songs written by Tim Kingsbury
Songs written by Richard Reed Parry
Songs about consumerism